Flemming  is a German television series.

Plot 
The main character is police psychologist Vince Flemming, who uses his skills to help solve difficult criminal cases in Berlin. He supports his ex-wife Ann Gittel, who works for the LKA 1. The place of action is the German capital Berlin. Gittel is also supported by KHK Blum. In season 1, LKA 1 was headed by Dr. Karl Leo, the director of criminal investigations, and as of season 2, by Walli Hoven, the director of criminal investigations. With Walli Hoven, the secretary Mette Jumarowski, who initially does not get along with Flemming, also joins the team. With the beginning of season 3, the investigation team is supplemented by the police photographer Robert Anda.

Guests
 Jean-Yves Berteloot as Dr. Baschyi Aschurew
 Shadi Hedayati as Ruba Abou-Fadi

External links
 

2009 German television series debuts
2012 German television series endings
German crime television series
German-language television shows
ZDF original programming
2000s German police procedural television series
2010s German police procedural television series